Paralethariicola is a genus of fungi in the family Odontotremataceae. This is a monotypic genus, containing the single species Paralethariicola aspiciliae.

References

Ostropales
Ostropales genera